Pristimantis ocreatus is a species of frog in the family Craugastoridae. Although often reported as being endemic to the Andes of northern Ecuador, it has also been reported from extreme southern Colombia (Colombian Massif in Nariño Department); the possibility of range extension to Colombia has been acknowledged. Its type locality is the west slope of volcano Chiles in the Carchi Province, and common name Carchi robber frog has been coined for it. These frogs have pale hands and feet, as if wearing gloves and socks—hence the specific name ocreatus, which is Latin and means "wearing leggings" or "booted".

Description
Pristimantis ocreatus is a small species: based on four males and two females, males measure  and females  in snout–vent length. Dorsum and upper flanks are dark brown. Some individuals have a reddish-brown mid-dorsal stripe or broad dorsal band. Most individuals have pale orange spots along dorsolateral folds. Flanks and venter are black with white spots. Hands and feet are white (except for outer edges). Iris is blue-gray. Skin of dorsum bears low ridges and finely areolate, subconical warts on the flanks.

Habitat and conservation
Natural habitats of Pristimantis ocreatus are sub-páramo and páramo habitats, but it can also occur in secondary forest. It is a fossorial species. The type series was collected under rocks and clumps of dirt by day. In Páramos del Angel it shares its habitat with the larger Pristimantis curtipes and Pristimantis thymelensis.

This species is threatened by habitat loss caused by agriculture and wood extraction. Burning in 2002–2003 may have extirpated this species from Páramos del Angel.

References

ocreatus
Amphibians of the Andes
Amphibians of Colombia
Amphibians of Ecuador
Páramo fauna
Amphibians described in 1981
Taxa named by John Douglas Lynch
Taxonomy articles created by Polbot